Mata Jaswant Kaur Memorial School, Badal, Punjab, India is a trust run school of the registered Chaudhary Devi Lal Memorial Trust. Opened in 2008, it is a free of cost institute located at Village Badal of Sri Muktsar Sahib District. The school's chairman is Parkash Singh Badal. The principal of the school is Mr. Pushpendra Kumar Rana. The school provides KG to senior secondary education.

External links
Mata Jaswant Kaur Memorial Official Website at www.mjkms.in

Schools in Punjab, India